is a passenger railway station located in Kita-ku of the city of Okayama, Okayama Prefecture, Japan. It is operated by West Japan Railway Company (JR West).

Lines

Station layout
The station consists of two opposed side platforms, connected by an elevated station building.The station building has a white-based appearance, and has a large roof over the wide south exit stairs. It is equipped with an elevator and a wheelchair-accessible restroom, making it barrier-free. The outbound platform is curved to match the tracks, and the train is tilting toward the platform Between the two passenger tracks lines, there is an outbound pull-up track for Okayama Freight Terminal, and freight train shunting work is often carried out. The station has a Midori no Madoguchi staffed ticket office.

Platforms

History
Kitanagase Station opened on October 1, 2005, on the site of the former Japan National Railways Okayama Switchyard.

Passenger statistics
In fiscal 2019, the station was used by an average of 4715 passengers daily.

Surrounding area
Okayama Dome
Okayama Seibu General Park
Okayama Municipal Hospital
Okayama Prefectural Okayama Daianji Secondary School

See also
List of railway stations in Japan

References

External links

 Kitanagase Station Official Site

Railway stations in Okayama
Sanyō Main Line
Railway stations in Japan opened in 2005